The 25th Cuban National Series season (1985-1986) was the first to feature four-team-playoffs with the first- and second-place teams from each of the new Western and Eastern League divisions, following the lead of Major League Baseball. This season marked the silver jubilee year since the league was founded.

Four teams qualified for the postseason playoffs: Industriales, Vegueros, Santiago de Cuba and Villa Clara. Industriales went undefeated as they swept the competition in the round-robin tournament, earning their sixth National Series title in with a walk off home run in extras against Vegueros on January 19, 1986, in front of their home fans.  Agustin Marquetti hit the walk off homer that secured the sixth ever national championship for the Industriales organization, the first ever championship walk off home run in modern Cuban baseball following the adoption of postseason play.

Standings

Western zone

Eastern zone

Playoffs

References

 (Note - text is printed in a white font on a white background, depending on browser used.)

Cuban National Series seasons
Base
Base
1986 in baseball